The 2001 Geiyo earthquake (2001年芸予地震 Nisen-ichi-nen Gēyo Jishin) occurred with a moment magnitude of 6.7 on March 24 at  near Hiroshima, Japan. One person in Hiroshima and one person in Ehime were reported dead. About 3,700 buildings were damaged in the Hiroshima area. Liquefaction was observed in Hiroshima and Ehime. Power outages occurred in the prefectures of Hiroshima, Ehime, Okayama, Yamaguchi, and Kōchi. The maximum intensity was shindo lower 6 in Hiroshima. This earthquake could be felt along the eastern and southern coasts of South Korea.

The released seismic moment of the earthquake was 1.3×1019 Nm. This earthquake is a normal faulting intraslab event within the subducting Philippine Sea Plate. The locations of aftershocks were distributed roughly in N-S direction. It has been suggested that this earthquake was related to the dehydration of the Philippine Sea Plate slab.

In this region, a strong earthquake occurred in 1905, which was also an intraslab event within the subducting plate.

See also
 List of earthquakes in 2001
 List of earthquakes in Japan

References

External links

Geiyo Earthquake
2001 in Japan
2001 disasters in Japan
March 2001 events in Japan
Earthquakes of the Heisei period
History of Hiroshima Prefecture